L'Opinion is a daily francophone Moroccan newspaper.

History and profile
L'Opinion was established in 1965. The daily is the organ of the Istiqlal Party. It is the sister publication of the Arabic-language newspaper Al-Alam and is based in Rabat.

During the mid-1970s the paper was frequently banned by the Moroccan authorities together with its sister publication, Al Alam, and Al Muharrir, another oppositional paper. From 1977 to 1992 Aicha Mekki reported on crime for the paper.

The 2001 circulation of the paper was 60,000 copies. It was 70,000 copies in 2003, making it the second most read paper in the country.

References

External links
 

1965 establishments in Morocco
Newspapers established in 1965
French-language newspapers published in Morocco
Newspapers published in Morocco
Socialist newspapers
Mass media in Rabat